Jyoti Kalash is a symbolic representation of Hindu goddess Durga. During Navaratri festival devotees light Jyoti Kalash, in temples of Devi, to appease her. The word Jyoti Kalash comes from combination of two Sanskrit words - Jyoti (Divine Light) and Kalasha.  

The Jyoti Kalash consists of earthen lamps (Diyas) lit with ghee, which are placed on earthen pots (Kalasha), covered with earthen lid. The fire (Jyoti) burns continuously for nine days and nights of Navaratri, symbolizing the divine presence of mother goddess on earth during nine days of Navaratri. Surrounding the main temple are many big halls where Jyoti Kalashas are lit by the devotees are kept for nine days, which are supervised by volunteers, who keep feeding the lamps with ghee for nine days. 

Many people install Jyoti Kalash at their home also during Navaratri. The procession of Jyoti Kalash is taken out on ninth and final day of festival to immerse the Jyoti Kalash in river or other water bodies. 

The Jyoti Kalash procession can be seen in Rajasthan Uttar Pradesh, Madhya Pradesh and especially in Chhattisgarh, where the festival and installation of Jyoti Kalash is very popular and people throng the temples of Bambleshwari, Danteshwari, Mahamaya, Maoli, Kankalin, Ashtabhuji Temple, Adbhar and many others to install the Jyoti Kalash.

References

External links
 Photo of hundreds of Jyoti Kalash at Raipur.
 Beautiful photo of Jyoti Kalashas at a temple in Madhya Pradesh.
 Jyoti Kalash house at Ratanpur's glorious MAHAMAYA TEMPLE.

See also
Garba

Objects used in Hindu worship
Hindu symbols
Containers
Fire in Hindu worship
Hindu iconography
Culture of Chhattisgarh
Religion in Uttar Pradesh
Culture of Madhya Pradesh
Rajasthani culture